Assin Central is one of the constituencies represented in the Parliament of Ghana. It elects one Member of Parliament (MP) by the first past the post system of election. Assin Central is located in the Assin North Municipal District of the Central Region of Ghana.

Boundaries 
The seat is located within the Assin North Municipal District of the Central Region of Ghana.

Members of Parliament 

Parliamentary constituencies in the Central Region (Ghana)